Rykard Jenkins (from Chatham, Kent) is a British reality television personality, personal trainer and aesthetic practitioner.

He is known for Ibiza Weekender series 6 in 2017 and Love Island series 2 in 2016. He decided to leave Love Island to join his co-star, Rachel Fenton.

References

Year of birth missing (living people)
Living people
People from Chatham, Kent
Love Island (2015 TV series) contestants